The Union of Forces for Change is an opposition political party in Togo. The President of the UFC was Gilchrist Olympio and its Secretary-General was Jean-Pierre Fabre until 10 August 2010. Olympio is the son of the first President of Togo, Sylvanus Olympio, who was assassinated in a 1963 coup. On 10 August 2010, Jean-Pierre Fabre was elected as President of the party.

History 
The UFC was founded by Olympio as a federation of parties on 1 February 1992. Olympio was barred from standing in the August 1993 presidential election on a technicality. The UFC boycotted the February 1994 parliamentary election. Olympio was able to run in the June 1998 presidential election, placing second with 34% of the vote, behind long-time President Gnassingbé Eyadéma, according to official results; the UFC alleged fraud, however. The UFC boycotted the March 1999 parliamentary election, and it also participated in an opposition boycott of the next parliamentary election, held on 27 October 2002.

Emmanuel Bob-Akitani, the First Vice-President of the UFC, was the main opposition candidate in the June 2003 presidential election and the April 2005 presidential election, acting as a surrogate candidate for Olympio, who was banned from running because he had lived in exile for several years. He officially received 38.1% of the vote on the latter occasion, losing to Faure Gnassingbé, son of the deceased Eyadéma, amidst opposition claims of a rigged vote.

The UFC decided not to join the national unity government under Prime Minister Yawovi Agboyibo in September 2006, although many in the party were reportedly unhappy with Olympio's decision in this regard. The party's Second Vice-President, Amah Gnassingbé, accepted a post in the government as Minister of State and was suspended from the UFC as a result.

The party participated in the October 2007 parliamentary election, the first time it participated in a parliamentary election since multiparty elections began to be held in the early 1990s. The party won 27 out of 81 seats, behind the ruling Rally of the Togolese People (RPT), which won a majority. The UFC alleged irregularities in vote counting  and, following the confirmation of the results by the Constitutional Court, UFC Secretary-General Jean-Pierre Fabré, described the results as "neither credible nor acceptable" and said that they did not represent the people's will.

At the UFC's Second Ordinary Congress, held in Nyékonakpoé, Lomé on 18–19 July 2008, Olympio was re-elected as National President of the UFC; he was also unanimously chosen as the party's candidate for the 2010 presidential election. Also at this congress, Jean-Pierre Fabré was re-elected as Secretary-General; Patrick Lawson was elected as First Vice-President, while Bob-Akitani was named Honorary President.

Electoral history

Presidential elections

National Assembly elections

References

External links 
 Official website

Political parties in Togo
Political parties established in 1992
1992 establishments in Togo